Trichosphaerella is a genus of lichenicolous fungi in the family Niessliaceae.

Species
, Species Fungorum accepts 7 species of Trichosphaerella:
Trichosphaerella arecae 
Trichosphaerella buckii 
Trichosphaerella ceratophora 
Trichosphaerella decipiens 
Trichosphaerella foliicola 
Trichosphaerella goniospora 
Trichosphaerella tuberculata

References

Sordariomycetes genera
Lichenicolous fungi
Niessliaceae
Taxa described in 1890
Taxa named by Pier Andrea Saccardo